Anneliese Kohlmann (1 March 1921 – 17 September 1977) was a German SS camp guard within the Nazi concentration camp system during World War II, notably, at the Neuengamme concentration camp established by the SS in Hamburg, Germany; and at Bergen-Belsen. She was tried for war crimes at the Belsen Trial in Lüneburg in 1946.

Camp service and postwar trial

Kohlmann was born in Hamburg to Margret and Georg Kohlmann, a Masonic leader. On 1 April 1940, she became a member of the NSDAP, but until November 1944 worked as a streetcar conductor. On 4 November 1944, Kohlmann joined the SS Women's Auxiliary and was appointed as Aufseherin at the Neugraben subcamp of the notorious Neuengamme concentration camp system using prisoner forced labour in various locations across northern Germany. In March 1945, she was transferred to slave-labor camp in Hamburg-Tiefstack. Soon after the liberation she was arrested on the grounds of Bergen-Belsen after her former victims from Neugraben and Tiefstack identified her wearing prisoner clothes. She was kept in Celle prison until her trial. Kohlmann was found guilty of repeatedly whipping inmates including pregnant women across the face, kicking until they lost consciousness, condemning at least one female prisoner to punishment of 30 lashes for a piece of stolen bread, and sexually exploiting younger women. She was sentenced to only two years in prison due to her short service in the SS and her defense's claim that she did not kill anyone. After serving her sentence (cut in half by time spent in jail before trial) Kohlmann remained in Hamburg. She moved to West Berlin in 1965. On 17 September 1977, Kohlmann died in Berlin at the age of 56.

Aufseherin Anneliese Kohlmann is most remembered as one of the SS female camp guards at Bergen-Belsen, ordered to help bury the bodies of camp victims in a mass grave, which was photographed by Life Magazine's photojournalist George Rodger and widely distributed thereafter.

In popular culture

 Kohlmann is one of the main characters in the play Under the Skin by Israeli playwright Yonatan Calderon. The play depicts a love affair between a lesbian Nazi commander (Kohlmann) and one of her female Jewish prisoners.

Further reading

 The Camp Women: The Female Auxiliaries Who Assisted the SS in Running the Concentration Camp System, by Daniel Patrick Brown. 
 Profit für den Bremer Senat — Hunger für die Frauen
 
 Franci’s War, by Franci Rabinek Epstein
 A Delayed Life, The powerful memoir of The Librarian of Auschwitz, by Dita Kraus - see Chapter 22 'Bubi' which is a personal story of interactions at the camp between 'Bubi' who she later discovered was Annelise

References

External links

  Photograph of Anneliese Kohlmann at the recently liberated Bergen-Belsen concentration camp, May 1945. BergenBelsen.co.uk images.
 Disturbing images of Anneliese Kohlmann, among other SS guards, forced to carry dead bodies into a mass grave at the recently liberated Bergen-Belsen concentration camp, May 1945. BergenBelsen.co.uk images.

1921 births
1977 deaths
Bergen-Belsen concentration camp personnel
Female guards in Nazi concentration camps
Neuengamme concentration camp personnel
People convicted in the Belsen trial
People from Hamburg